The Hockaday School is an independent, secular, college preparatory day school for girls located in Dallas, Texas, United States. The boarding school was for girls in grades 8–12 and the day school is from pre-kindergarten to grade 12. The Hockaday School is accredited by the Independent Schools Association of the Southwest.

History
The school was founded in 1913 by Ela Hockaday in response to a group of Dallas businessmen's demand to pioneer an academic institution for their daughters, one equal to that of their sons’ educational experiences. She added a junior college in 1931 which operated until 1951. The first class consisted of only ten students. Sarah Trent was one of the first teachers at the school and was influential in its development.  As of the 1940 census, Ela Hockaday was living at the school that was located in the block between 5601 Bonita and 2407 Greenville Avenue in Dallas.

Tuition
The tuition averages $32,000 for upper school day students (not including books). For resident students, costs are approximately $62,828 - $64,191. Financial aid is granted on the basis of demonstrated family need and the school's availability of funds. In 2019–2020, 13% of the Hockaday student body received financial aid.

Athletics
Hockaday competes in the Southwest Preparatory Conference (SPC) in 11 sports: basketball, cross-country, field hockey, golf, lacrosse, soccer, softball, swimming and diving, tennis, track and field, and volleyball.

In addition, they compete in crew (rowing) and fencing.

Publications 
Hockaday's mass communication publications are student-run and designed. They produce the newspaper, Fourcast, once a month and the literary magazine, Vibrato, once a year.

Vibrato has won national awards, including the Gold Crown Award (CSPA), Pacemaker Award (NSPA), and Best in Show (NSPA), through Columbia Scholastic Press Association and National Scholastic Press Association.

Notable alumnae

 Allister Adel, County Attorney for Maricopa County, Arizona
 Jay Presson Allen, 1940. Screenwriter, playwright, novelist. 
 Barbara Pierce Bush, attended but left before high school. Co-founder and president, Global Health Corps. Presidential daughter.
 Dixie Carter, 1982. Businesswoman; president of Total Nonstop Action Wrestling.
 Victoria Clark, 1978. Tony award-winning singer and actress.'
 Rita Crocker Clements, 1949. Republican Party organizer, First Lady of Texas.
 Deborah Coonts. Romantic mystery novelist and lawyer.
 Frances Farenthold, 1926. Politician, lawyer, activist.
 Farrah Forke, 1986. Actress. Wings, Lois and Clark: The New Adventures of Superman
 Jenna Bush Hager, attended but left before high school. Author, Ana's Story: A Journey of Hope. Presidential daughter.
 Amanda Havard, 2004. Novelist.
 Lyda Hill, 1960. Businesswoman, philanthropist.
 Caroline Rose Hunt, 1941. Founder, Rosewood Hotels & Resorts. Writer. Philanthropist.
 Helen LaKelly Hunt, 1967. Writer, psychotherapist, philanthropist
 June Hunt, 1965. Bible-based counselor and radio personality. Philanthropist.
 Swanee Hunt, 1968. Ambassador to Austria, Harvard lecturer, photographer, philanthropist.
 Nasreen Pervin Huq, 1976. Activist and campaigner for women's rights and social justice
 Annemarie Jacir, 1992. Palestinian filmmaker and poet
 Lisa Loeb, 1986. Singer-songwriter.
 Dorothy Malone, 1943. Actor
 Anne Windfohr Marion, President of Burnett Ranches and Chairman of Burnett Oil Company.
 Frances Mossiker, 1922. Historical novelist
 Anne W. Patterson, 1967. Assistant Secretary of State for Near Eastern Affairs
 Renee Peck, 1971. Journalist.
 Dawn Prestwich, 1978. Television producer and screenwriter.
 Patricia Richardson, 1968. Actor. Home Improvement 
 Holland Roden, 2005. Teen Wolf, 12 Miles of Bad Road, Lost
 Harriet Schock, 1958. Songwriter
 Amy Talkington. Filmmaker, screenwriter. 
 Lyda Ann Thomas, 1954. Mayor of Galveston, Texas.
 Pamela Willeford, 1968. Former U.S. Ambassador to Switzerland and Liechtenstein.

References

External links

 The Hockaday School website

Private K-12 schools in Dallas
Independent Schools Association of the Southwest
Educational institutions established in 1913
Girls' schools in Texas
Preparatory schools in Texas
1913 establishments in Texas